La Florida is a town and municipality in the Nariño Department, Colombia.

The village of La Florida was founded on 11 November 1820 under the original name of Mombuco which means "small valley". It was founded by Juan Meneses and formed part of the dioceses of San Bartholome of Matituy. It was renamed in 1843 to the name of La Florida.

Its current population is of 25,529.

References

Municipalities of Nariño Department